Miguel Ángel Arellano Pulido (born 11 May 1952) is a Mexican politician from the Party of the Democratic Revolution. From 2006 to 2009 he served as Deputy of the LX Legislature of the Mexican Congress representing Michoacán.

References

1952 births
Living people
Politicians from Michoacán
Party of the Democratic Revolution politicians
21st-century Mexican politicians
Universidad Michoacana de San Nicolás de Hidalgo alumni
Mexican prosecutors
Deputies of the LX Legislature of Mexico
Members of the Chamber of Deputies (Mexico) for Michoacán